Guenter Karl Butschek (born 21 October 1960) is a German businessman and the current CEO and Managing Director of Indian automotive company Tata Motors. Apart from managing Tata Motors' India business, Butschek is also responsible for all other domestic and overseas subsidiaries, joint ventures and associates of Tata Motors. He took over on February 25, 2016, after a global search spanning almost two years. He is the highest paid CEO among Indian auto companies. Before this he was the COO of Airbus for four years and previously he worked at Daimler AG for 25 years.

References

Chief operating officers
German chief executives
Living people
Chief executives in the automobile industry
1960 births